Colin Flinn (born 1953), is a male retired boxer who competed for England.

Boxing career
Flinn was National Championship runner-up in the prestigious 1973 ABA featherweight Championship, boxing out of Tile Hill ABC.

He was then selected for England in the featherweight (-57 Kg) division, at the 1974 British Commonwealth Games in Christchurch, New Zealand.

References

1953 births
English male boxers
Boxers at the 1974 British Commonwealth Games
Living people
Featherweight boxers
Commonwealth Games competitors for England